The third season of the American sitcom The Big Bang Theory aired on CBS from September 21, 2009 to May 24, 2010. It received higher ratings than the previous two seasons with over 15 million viewers. The third season saw the first appearances of future main cast members Melissa Rauch and Mayim Bialik as Bernadette Rostenkowski and Dr. Amy Farrah Fowler respectively. 

Christine Baranski was nominated for the Primetime Emmy Award for Outstanding Guest Actress in a Comedy Series at the 62nd Primetime Emmy Awards for the episode, "The Maternal Congruence". Jim Parsons won the Primetime Emmy Award for Outstanding Lead Actor in a Comedy Series for the episode "The Pants Alternative".

Cast

Main cast
 Johnny Galecki as Leonard Hofstadter
 Jim Parsons as Sheldon Cooper
 Kaley Cuoco as Penny
 Simon Helberg as Howard Wolowitz
 Kunal Nayyar as Rajesh Ramayan Koothrappali

Recurring cast
 Laurie Metcalf as Mary Cooper
 Carol Ann Susi as Mrs. Wolowitz
 John Ross Bowie as Dr. Barry Kripke
 Wil Wheaton as himself
 Kevin Sussman as Stuart Bloom
 Melissa Rauch as Bernadette Rostenkowski
 Brian George as Dr. V.M. Koothrappali
 Alice Amter as Mrs. Koothrappali
 Christine Baranski as Dr. Beverly Hofstadter
 Sara Gilbert as Leslie Winkle
 Brian Thomas Smith as Zack Johnson

Guest cast
 Lewis Black as Professor Crawley
 Molly Morgan as Bethany
 Sarah Buehler as Sarah
 Andy Mackenzie as Skeeter
 Elizabeth Bogush as Dr. Catherine Millstone
 Oliver Muirhead as Professor Laughlin
 Zachary Abel as Todd
 Jason Mesches as Denny
 Danica McKellar as Abby
 Jen Drohan as Martha
 Julio Oscar Mechoso as Officer Hackett
 Yeardley Smith as Sandy 
 Kevin Brief as Glenn
 Steve Paymer as Judge Kirby
 Marcus Folmar as Guard
 Frank Maharajh as Venkatesh Koothrappali
 Judy Greer as Dr. Elizabeth Plimpton
 Ally Maki as Joyce Kim
 Steven Yeun as Sebastian 
 Ajgie Kirkland as Louie/Louise
 Lauri Johnson as Mrs. Gunderson
 Mayim Bialik as Dr. Amy Farrah Fowler

Special guest cast
 Katee Sackhoff as herself 
 Ira Flatow as himself
 Stan Lee as himself

 James Earl Jones as himself
 Stephen Hawking as himself
 Elon Musk as himself

Episodes

Ratings

Reception 
The third season received critical acclaim. Maureen Ryan of Chicago Tribune who wrote that "Big Bang Theory, which is in its third season, is doing many things very right", Alan Sepinwall of The Star-Ledger wrote "the Penny/Sheldon interaction was gold, as always", and Ken Tucker of Entertainment Weekly, who wrote that "what lifts The Big Bang Theory into frequent excellence is its one constant from the start: the brilliantly nuanced performance of Jim Parsons".

The American Film Institute ranked season three one of the ten best television seasons of 2009.

References 

General references

External links

2009 American television seasons
2010 American television seasons
The Big Bang Theory seasons